The Queen's Club Pro tennis tournament was held in 1927 and 1928. It went by the name of the Professional Championship of the World in 1927, gaining the tournament great notability. The tournament was held in October on clay courts, at the Queen's Club, with the hopes that it would become a permanent fixture like the amateur championships (Grand Slams), and be considered one of the major pro events like the US Pro and Bristol Cup. It was discontinued and wasn't held in 1929.

Past finals

Singles

See also
Major professional tennis tournaments before the Open Era

References

Clay court tennis tournaments
Defunct tennis tournaments in the United Kingdom
Tennis in London
Professional tennis tournaments before the Open Era